Yasmine Mohmed Abdulmagid Rostom (born 25 July 1993 in Alexandria) is an Egyptian Olympic rhythmic gymnast.

Career 
Rostom competed at the 2009 World Championships in Mie, Japan, where she finished 111th in all-around qualifications. In 2010, she competed at the World Championships in Moscow, finishing 77th individually in qualifications, and 29th with the Egyptian team. At the 2011 World Championships in Montpellier, France, she finished 66th individually in qualifications, and 21st with the Egyptian team.

Rostom won the African Gymnastics Championships, thus qualifying to the 2012 Olympic Games in London. At London 2012, she finished 23rd out of 24 competitors in the individual all-around, ahead of Great Britain's Francesca Jones. Rostom is the first Egyptian to compete in rhythmic gymnastics at the Olympics.

In 2013, Rostom competed at the World Championships in Kyiv, placing 72nd in all-around qualifications.

Personal life and family 
Rostom's younger sister, Sara Rostom, is also a rhythmic gymnast.

References

1993 births
Living people
Egyptian rhythmic gymnasts
Olympic gymnasts of Egypt
Gymnasts at the 2012 Summer Olympics
Sportspeople from Alexandria